Guglielmo Marconi was the name of at least two ships of the Italian Navy named in honour of Guglielmo Marconi and may refer to:

 , a  launched in 1939 and sunk in 1941.
 , a  launched in 1980 and decommissioned in 2003.

Italian Navy ship names